During the 1999–2000 English football season, Chesterfield F.C. competed in the Football League Second Division where they finished in 24th position and were relegated to Division Three.

Final league table

Results
Chesterfield's score comes first

Legend

Football League Division Two

League Cup

FA Cup

Football League Trophy

Squad
Appearances for competitive matches only

References

Chesterfield 1999–2000 at soccerbase.com (use drop down list to select relevant season)

See also
1999–2000 in English football

Chesterfield F.C. seasons
Chesterfield